Phil Rees may refer to:

 Phil Rees (academic) (born 1944), British population geographer and demographer
 Phil Rees (greyhound trainer) (1914–1986), three times British champion trainer

See also
 Philip Rees (born 1941), British writer and librarian